Kaligandaki may refer to:
Gandaki River, known as Kali Gandaki at its source
Kaligandaki, Syangja, a rural municipality in Syangja district of Nepal
Kaligandaki, Gulmi, a rural municipality in Gulmi district of Nepal
Kaligandaki (TV series)